Yepifan is an urban locality (a work settlement) in Kimovsky District of Tula Oblast, Russia, located on the left bank of the Don River about  southeast of Kimovsk and  southeast of Tula, in the proximity of the Kulikovo Field. Population: 

Yepifan was founded by Prince Ivan Mstislavsky (Ivan the Terrible's cousin) as a fort against the Crimean Tatars (see Great Abatis Border). The people of Yepifan supported Ivan Bolotnikov during the Time of Troubles. The town was ravaged by Ivan Zarutsky and the Tatars on several occasions. The last Tatar raid on Yepifan was recorded in 1659.

Peter the Great intended to connect the Volga and the Don Rivers through a system of waterways and sluices centred on Yepifan. It soon became clear that the projected Ivanovsky Canal was not suitable for navigation, and the project of the Yepifan Admiralty was abandoned. Andrei Platonov wrote a novella on the subject.

In the 19th century, Yepifan was the center of an uyezd famed for its annual fair. The Neoclassical cathedral of St. Nicholas was consecrated in 1850 and remains the settlement's most important landmark.

References

Urban-type settlements in Tula Oblast
Yepifansky Uyezd
Defunct towns in Russia
Former cities in Russia